Bergen school may refer to:

Bergen School (art)
Bergen School of Architecture
Bergen School of Meteorology